"More Than I Knew" is a song by Canadian singer Deborah Cox. It was written by Cox along with Thaddeus Dixon, Samantha Nelson-Gums, and Jeremy Gritter for her unreleased sixth studio album Work of Art, initially announced for an August 2015 release through Deco and Primary Wave Music. The song was released as the album's second single on April 14, 2015 and peaked at number 16 on the US Billboard Adult R&B Songs.

Track listing

Charts

Release history

References

2015 songs
2015 singles
Deborah Cox songs
Songs written by Thaddeus Dixon
Songs written by Deborah Cox